John Norman (born 6 January 1991) is a Swedish professional ice hockey player. He is currently a centre for Djurgårdens IF of the HockeyAllsvenskan (Allsv).

Playing career 
Norman began playing hockey in local club Danderyds SK. He is the oldest of five brothers. He played Stocksund's under-18 team until the 2007–08 season when he moved to Djurgården. He also participated in TV-pucken the same season. Norman's team Stockholm/Vit reached the final which ended with a 2–1 defeat to Småland. Norman had a successful season in Djurgården's J20 team, scoring 15 goals and 49 points in 42 games, and signed a two-year deal to play in Djurgården's senior team in February 2010. He had already debuted in Elitserien prior to this, on October 27, 2009 against Skellefteå AIK.

Norman moved to Kärpät of Finland for the 2012–13 season and after a single season with the club returned to his native Sweden, where he signed with Skellefteå AIK of the SHL. He helped the team win the Swedish national championship his first year and reached the SHL finals with Skellefteå in 2015 and 2016. He was AIK's second-best scorer of the 2015–16 regular season, tallying 17 goals and 25 assists.

Following the 2015–16 campaign, he took his game to the Kontinental Hockey League, signing with Torpedo Nizhny Novgorod. On August 19, 2017, it was announced that Norman will continue his KHL career with Jokerit of Helsinki, Finland.

Norman played five seasons with Jokerit before the club withdrew from the KHL during the 2021–22 season due to the Russian invasion of Ukraine.

As a free agent from Jokerit, Norman opted to return to his original Swedihs club, Djurgårdens IF, signing a two-year contract on 21 April 2022 in the hopes of returning the club to the SHL following their relegation to the Allsvenskan the previous season.

International play
Norman made his debut on Sweden's men's national team in November 2015.

Career statistics

Regular season and playoffs

International

References

External links

1991 births
Djurgårdens IF Hockey players
Jokerit players
Living people
Ice hockey players at the 2018 Winter Olympics
Olympic ice hockey players of Sweden
Oulun Kärpät players
Skellefteå AIK players
Swedish ice hockey centres
Torpedo Nizhny Novgorod players
Ice hockey people from Stockholm